Adiyeduttharulal was an event of Akilam One in Akilattirattu Ammanai, the religious book of Ayyavazhi, which shows the method by which Akilam was written.

See also

 List of Ayyavazhi-related articles

Ayyavazhi